Bimal Minj (born 4 June 1988, in Jharkhand) is an Indian footballer who plays as a defender for ONGC F.C. in the I-League.

International
Minj was part of the India U20 team in 2005–06.

Career statistics

Club
Statistics accurate as of 11 May 2013

References

Indian footballers
1988 births
Living people
Footballers from Jharkhand
I-League players
ONGC FC players
India youth international footballers
Association football defenders